Patrick Justin McAfee (born May 2, 1987) is an American sports analyst,  professional wrestling color commentator, professional wrestler and former football punter and kickoff specialist. McAfee is an analyst on ESPN's College GameDay, a television program covering college football. He is currently signed to WWE, where he performs and serves as a color commentator for the SmackDown brand.

He was a placekicker at West Virginia and drafted by the Indianapolis Colts in the seventh round of the 2009 NFL Draft and played in the Super Bowl his rookie year in a loss to the New Orleans Saints. Over his eight-year career in the National Football League (NFL), McAfee made two Pro Bowls and was an All-Pro in 2014.

Since his retirement from football in February 2017, McAfee has been a football analyst. He was a guest host for Fox Sports' college and NFL broadcasts in late 2018, before being announced as part of ESPN's Thursday Night College Football team in July 2019. In addition, he makes regular appearances for Get Up!. He currently presents The Pat McAfee Show on YouTube.

McAfee served as a guest commentator for WWE's NXT TakeOver events in 2018, before signing a contract with the promotion in February 2019. During 2020, he feuded with Adam Cole, making his WWE NXT in-ring debut at TakeOver XXX in a loss to Cole.

Early life
McAfee was born to Tim and Sally McAfee on May 2, 1987, in Plum, a suburb of Pittsburgh, Pennsylvania. He attended Plum High School, playing soccer, volleyball and football; and received collegiate interest for all three. As a senior, he borrowed $100 from a friend and played poker at an illegal club, turning it into $1,400. He used the funds to finance a trip to Miami to participate in the final day of a national competition highlighting the best field goal kicking prospects in America. McAfee made nine consecutive field goals, starting at 25 yards and moving five yards out each time. He narrowly missed a 70-yard field goal, with the ball missing to the right but with enough distance to make it. After returning home, he was approached in the school's lunchroom by Tony Gibson, West Virginia's recruiting coordinator, who offered him a scholarship.

College career

Freshman season (2005) 
McAfee earned the starting job at West Virginia as a freshman. He was 11-for-18 as a freshman on field goals, and had 70 kickoffs for the season, with 20 touchbacks. McAfee's most memorable moment came against Louisville in a 46–44 triple-overtime win, which was reached after a successful McAfee onside kick. The onside kick gave running back Steve Slaton the chance to tie the game with a one-yard touchdown run.

Sophomore season (2006) 
Although they had losses to Louisville and USF, the Mountaineers won 10 games and were victors in the Gator Bowl over Georgia Tech.

Junior season (2007) 
McAfee started his junior season with a missed extra point against Western Michigan, ending his streak of 106 consecutive extra points. He finished the season in the Fiesta Bowl with a 2-for-4 performance, having one kick blocked by Oklahoma. He was named to the ESPN All-Bowl Team following the bowl season.

McAfee missed two relatively short field goals in WVU's 13–9 loss to a Pitt Panthers team with only four wins; ultimately taking the Mountaineers out of the BCS National Championship Game. He was named to the 2007 Lou Groza Award semi-finalist list for the best collegiate kicker. McAfee earned Big East Special Team Player of the week honors three times in 2007 and was named second-team All-Big East. He earned West Virginia's Scott Shirley Award for the second consecutive year.

Senior season (2008) 
McAfee began his senior year in a 48–21 season-opening victory over Villanova in which he kicked two field goals, including a career-long of 52-yards, six extra points, and two punts. In the following 27–3 win over Marshall, McAfee became the school record holder for all-time scoring with a field goal, passing Slaton. He went two for two on-field goals to move to third place for the Big East record of career field goals made in a 34–17 victory over Auburn.

Against Cincinnati on November 8, the Mountaineers trailed by 13 points with 1:11 left in regulation, but reduced the deficit to 3 points with a safety, touchdown, and two-point conversion, all in less than a minute. McAfee's onside kick was recovered with 18 seconds remaining. He then tied the game as time expired with a 52-yard field goal, but the Mountaineers would lose in overtime.

McAfee finished his senior year with a career-best 44.7 yards per punt average, a Big East-leading 23 punts inside the 20-yard line, and a career-high 2,639 yards with a 65-yard long. He was named a finalist for the Ray Guy Award losing out to Matt Fodge.

Professional career

Pre-draft 

After his senior season at WVU, McAfee was invited to the 2009 Senior Bowl in Alabama, joining Mountaineers Pat White and Ellis Lankster. He started the Senior Bowl as the South team's kicker. McAfee performed in the 11th annual State Farm College Football All-Star Challenge, winning the "round the world" kicking competition. As he was not invited to the NFL Combine, he had team workouts with the Indianapolis Colts, Dallas Cowboys and New England Patriots, all as a kicker.

Indianapolis Colts 
McAfee was drafted in the seventh round with the 222nd overall pick in the 2009 NFL Draft by the Indianapolis Colts. McAfee was signed before training camp. He handled punting and kick-off duties for the Colts in 2009, as well as holding for extra points and field goals, a position he had never played before. In 2009, McAfee was part of the Indianapolis team that won the AFC South, the AFC Championship, and reached Super Bowl XLIV. McAfee kicked off the game and handled kickoff and punt duties in the 31–17 loss to the New Orleans Saints. As a result of a successful 2009 season, he was named to the 2009 NFL All-Rookie Team.

McAfee maintained a 46.6-yard punting average for the 2011 regular season, a mark he would better the following season by posting a 48.2-yard average on punts.

On January 4, 2014, McAfee tweeted a photo with Colts teammate Andrew Luck in the background, almost completely nude. McAfee, who was taking a picture of kicker Adam Vinatieri being interviewed in the locker room, apologized for the incident and was fined $10,000 by the Colts organization, according to his interview with The Bob & Tom Show. On March 7, McAfee announced he had signed a five-year contract to remain with the Colts.

McAfee was named the AFC Special Teams Player of the Month for September 2014. He led the NFL in punting average (45.6 yards) and touchbacks on kickoff (24), and converted the NFL's only two successful onside kicks in the first four weeks of the season. In Week 6, against the Houston Texans, McAfee converted his third onside kick of the season, recovering the ball himself after it traveled the necessary 10 yards. On December 23, 2014, McAfee was selected to play in his first Pro Bowl, and on January 2, 2015, he was selected by the Associated Press as the First Team All-Pro punter.

In Week 3 of the 2015 season, McAfee earned AFC Special Teams Player of the Week against the Tennessee Titans.

On December 20, 2016, McAfee was named to his second Pro Bowl.

On February 2, 2017, after eight seasons, McAfee retired from the NFL and stated he intended to join Barstool Sports as a contributor. He cited his recent knee operation (his third in four seasons) as a factor in his decision, as well as his fractured relationship with Colts' general manager Ryan Grigson.

During the 2020 NFL season, despite being out of the NFL for four years, fans began making a push for McAfee to come out of retirement to play for his hometown Pittsburgh Steelers, who struggled with their punting during the season. McAfee himself added to the rumors by immediately tweeting a video of him punting after the Steelers released Dustin Colquitt without immediately signing a replacement. The team ended up re-signing Jordan Berry, who had been the team's punter for five years prior to the signing of Colquitt.

NFL career statistics

Regular season

Postseason

Post-playing career

Barstool Sports
Following his retirement from football at the close of the 2016 season, McAfee joined Barstool Sports, where he developed the "Heartland" division of the company in Indianapolis and hosted The Pat McAfee Show on SiriusXM channel Barstool Power 85. McAfee announced his separation from Barstool Sports on August 31, 2018, citing a lack of transparency with the business operations of the company as his reason for leaving.

Pat McAfee Inc.

Upon departing from Barstool Sports in 2018, McAfee incorporated a small business, Pat McAfee Inc. (PMI), from his original office in Indianapolis. PMI continued to operate McAfee's charity, The Pat McAfee Foundation, and began selling merchandise. At first, PMI produced four podcasts, The Pat McAfee Show 2.0, That's Hockey Talk, Heartland Radio 2.0, and Good Bettor Bets. The former two are still in operation as of 2021, with The Pat McAfee Show 2.0 re-running clips from his daily show on Sirius XM, while That's Hockey Talk was originally co-hosted by former NFL center A. Q. Shipley, but Shipley was replaced by former NHL player Mike Rupp in 2021. Heartland Radio 2.0 evolved into The Pod after the departure of former host, Todd McComas, while PMI's gambling podcast, Good Bettor Bets, re-branded into Hammer Dahn with the addition of former NFL general manager Michael Lombardi as a guest co-host.

On August 7, 2019, it was reported that McAfee would begin to host a two-hour, weekday radio show, The Pat McAfee Show, beginning September 9, 2019, syndicated by DAZN and Westwood One. The deal with DAZN also includes McAfee streaming his podcast on the service three times per week, and appearances in NFL-related shoulder content in regions where DAZN holds streaming rights to the league (primarily Canada and Germany). They parted ways in August 2020 due to McAfee's disdain for FCC regulations on terrestrial radio.

In September 2020, The Pat McAfee Show moved to Sirius XM's Mad Dog Sports Radio from 12:00 PM to 3:00 PM on weekdays. The show is also broadcast live on YouTube. Former NFL linebacker, and consistent collaborator, A. J. Hawk co-hosts the second and third hour of the show with McAfee. McAfee's former teammate Darius Butler co-hosts the show on Fridays when it is broadcast from Tampa, FL. During the NFL season, McAfee frequently hosts Green Bay Packers quarterback Aaron Rodgers on his program. Sirius XM stopped airing the show in August 2022.

In March 2021, PMI brought back The Best Wrestling Show, formerly known as Wrasslin' With Sports Entertainment, a wrestling podcast that had aired one episode in 2019. It is hosted by former WWE employee and PMI executive producer Mike Mansury, and Pittsburgh-based radio commentator & former World Championship Wrestling commentator Mark Madden. The podcast was short-lived, as Mansury left PMI to focus on independent work in May of the same year and the low viewership numbers caused by Madden.

In 2021, McAfee announced plans to move PMI’s base of operations to a former United Methodist Church in Lawrence, Indiana.

On December 9, 2021, McAfee announced a four-year, $120 million deal with FanDuel, making them the sole odds provider for the Pat McAfee Show.

Fox Sports
On November 24, 2018, McAfee made his college football broadcasting debut on Fox, calling a college football game between Baylor and Texas Tech. On December 30, McAfee made his NFL broadcasting debut on Fox, joining Justin Kutcher, Robert Smith, and sideline reporter Sarah Kustok for the Lions–Packers game.

ESPN

On July 29, 2019, Adam Schefter announced via Twitter that McAfee would be joining ESPN as the color analyst for their Thursday Night College Football broadcasts, alongside Matt Hasselbeck. The news came after McAfee had auditioned for ESPN's Monday Night Football after Jason Witten's return to the Cowboys, though ESPN decided to retain its booth as-is. In the same year, McAfee began making regular appearances on Get Up! and College GameDay, after appearing on the latter show as a celebrity guest picker.

In September 2022, it was announced that McAfee would be returning to ESPN. He serves as a full-time analyst on College Gameday. He will also serve as an analyst for ESPN's coverage of the Rose Bowl, the College Football Playoff, the Super Bowl and Pro Bowl. McAfee is also a part of Peyton Manning’s Omaha Productions college football alternate telecasts on ESPN2. He has appeared as a guest twice on Monday Night Football with Peyton and Eli.

Other appearances
In 2016, McAfee performed in stand-up events around Indiana. McAfee was a regular on the nationally syndicated morning radio program The Bob & Tom Show, itself based in Indianapolis. He has described co-host Bob Kevoian as one of his best friends during an interview on the Off the Air Podcast hosted by sports commentator Chick McGee. In 2018, McAfee made his professional baseball debut for the Washington Wild Things as a right-fielder and guest first base coach. He made a putout in the outfield and went 0–3 at the plate, reaching second base on a throwing error before being replaced with a pinch runner.

He was a sideline reporter for the XFL for some of its games in 2020.

McAfee is a co-host on the sports gambling podcast Hammer Dahn, which is produced by his business, Pat McAfee Inc. He makes occasional appearances on PMI's other podcasts, The Pod and That's Hockey Talk.

Professional wrestling career

Early career
A month before the NFL Draft on March 22, 2009, McAfee was involved in a match against The WarPig at an IWA East Coast show in South Charleston, West Virginia. WarPig controlled much of the match but, McAfee hit him with a low blow and a superkick, securing an upset victory. Nine years later, in March 2018, McAfee was present at an NXT show in Indianapolis, where he prevented Adam Cole from winning by disqualification in his match against Aleister Black. Instead, McAfee's distraction gave Black enough time to recover and hit Cole with his finisher, Black Mass.

In June 2017, McAfee briefly trained as a professional wrestler with Rip Rogers, which was filmed for Barstool Sports.

WWE (2018–present)

Early appearances (2018–2020) 
During 2018, McAfee began appearing on WWE programming as a pre-show analyst for the company's NXT TakeOver events, beginning with NXT TakeOver: New Orleans, where he continued his mini-feud with Adam Cole. He later appeared at NXT TakeOver: Chicago II, NXT TakeOver: Brooklyn 4 and NXT TakeOver: WarGames.  In December, it was reported that he had formally signed a multi-year contract with WWE, and officially signed the contract in February 2019. He then began hosting live watch-along of WWE's pay-per-views on YouTube, beginning with Fastlane, alongside a number of WWE wrestlers. In the buildup to WrestleMania, McAfee, his crew and various special guests travelled venue to venue in an RV, that his friend Zito got stuck under an awning at MetLife Stadium,  which was filmed for Pat McAfee's Road to WrestleMania. Backstage at the event, McAfee got into an argument with Michael Cole, when Cole had criticized him for wearing tuxedo shorts. McAfee threatened to quit on the spot and was sent to another room while the situation was dealt with. After Vince McMahon was shown an image of LeBron James at the 2018 NBA Finals, and that the outfit was similar to the one McAfee was wearing for WrestleMania, McMahon approved and McAfee was allowed to co-host the second hour of the pre-show, alongside Charly Caruso.

McAfee made a guest appearance on the November 1 episode of SmackDown.

The Kings of NXT (2020–2021) 

As part of NXT, he also was involved in storylines, including one with the NXT Champion Adam Cole. At NXT TakeOver XXX, McAfee was defeated by Cole. McAfee's storyline included his own stable named The Kings of NXT, which included Pete Dunne, Ridge Holland, Danny Burch and Oney Lorcan. The feud between Undisputed Era and Kings of NXT concluded at NXT TakeOver: WarGames, where McAfee's team was defeated.

Move to SmackDown (2021–2022)
On April 16, 2021, WWE announced that McAfee had been moved to the SmackDown brand, serving as color commentator alongside Michael Cole . On March 3, 2022 on The Pat McAfee Show, McAfee would interview Vince McMahon, in which McMahon would offer McAfee a match at WrestleMania. At WrestleMania 38, McAfee would defeat Theory, before challenging Vince McMahon to an impromptu match straight after, which McMahon accepted and won. Following that match, Theory and McMahon would continue to attack McAfee until Stone Cold Steve Austin would interrupt and give all three of them a Stone Cold Stunner. His next on-screen feud was with Baron Corbin, defeating him at SummerSlam. WWE announced on September 7 that McAfee was taking a hiatus from working for WWE for the foreseeable future as he is set to join ESPN's College GameDay, and will return once it has ended.

Return (2023–present)

At the 2023 Royal Rumble, McAfee made a surprise return for commentary right before the men's Royal Rumble match began to a largely positive reception from the crowd, and even his commentary partner, Michael Cole. He joined Cole and Corey Graves on commentary.

Personal life
On October 20, 2010, McAfee was arrested and charged with public intoxication, a Class B misdemeanor. McAfee had been allegedly found shirtless and wet, and alleged to have swum in a canal in Broad Ripple, a popular nightclub area in Indianapolis, at approximately 5:15 that morning after being reported by a woman who found him near her car. Police reported that he tested with a blood alcohol content of 0.15. The Colts later issued a one-game suspension to McAfee for his actions. Two weeks after being arrested, McAfee issued an apology for his actions. "Obviously I made a dumb decision on a night when things got out of control," he said. "I will never put my team or my family through this kind of embarrassment again."

On February 5, 2016, McAfee became a Guinness World Record holder by successfully kicking a 40-yard field goal while blindfolded. The record was surpassed two years later when Davis Brief, a fan of McAfee's, kicked a 45-yard field goal while blindfolded on September 23, 2018.

McAfee became engaged to his girlfriend, Samantha Ludy, in February 2019. The two were married August 1, 2020, at Coxhall Gardens in Carmel, Indiana.

McAfee is good friends with fellow wrestler and fellow former football player Thomas Pestock, best known by his ring names Baron Corbin, King Corbin, and Happy Corbin. They were teammates at the Indianapolis Colts and lived together during their rookie year. They bonded over their love for wrestling and eventually would work a match together at SummerSlam 2022.

Philanthropy 
In November 2011, McAfee cut his hair for Locks of Love, an organization that provides hairpieces for children who are suffering from long-term illness and are poor.
In May 2016, McAfee created a company named Shirts for America, to serve as a sponsor for IndyCar driver Conor Daly for the 2016 Indianapolis 500 and to support both the Pat McAfee Foundation and Wish for Our Heroes.
In 2020, McAfee donated $200,000 to the Barstool Fund, a charity started by Dave Portnoy to provide relief to small business owners impacted by the COVID-19 pandemic.
In 2021, he donated over $6 million to various causes, including sports teams at his hometown high school Plum, the children’s hospital at WVU, and a football program for under privileged youth run by former teammate Robert Mathis.

Championships and accomplishments
Wrestling Observer Newsletter
Rookie of the Year (2020)
 Worst Match of the Year (2022) 

 WWE
 NXT Year-End Award (1 time)
 Rivalry of the Year (2020)

References

External links
West Virginia Mountaineers bio

 

1987 births
Living people
People from Allegheny County, Pennsylvania
Sportspeople from the Pittsburgh metropolitan area
Players of American football from Pennsylvania
American football placekickers
American football punters
West Virginia Mountaineers football players
Indianapolis Colts players
Unconferenced Pro Bowl players
American Conference Pro Bowl players
College football announcers
National Football League announcers
XFL (2020) broadcasters
American baseball players
21st-century American comedians
American podcasters
American YouTubers
Barstool Sports people
YouTube podcasters
Professional wrestling announcers
Professional wrestling podcasters
American male professional wrestlers
Sports YouTubers
Wrestling Observer Newsletter award winners
21st-century professional wrestlers
Professional wrestlers from Pennsylvania